J. Emory D. Shaw (1863 – June 10, 1943) was an American musician, educator, and academic administrator. He served as the musical director of Wilson College, president of Kee Mar College, and director of fine arts at Southwestern University.

Early life and education 
J. Emory Shaw was born in Baltimore in 1863, the son of Greenbury Washington Shaw, a sailmaker, and Ann Eliza Travers. He began to study the piano at the age of 15, and at 19 he took up vocal instruction for which he had the strongest predilection. At his parents' request, he continued studying piano and theory. Shaw received private instruction at home and abroad.

Career 
Shaw relocated to Richmond, Virginia. There, he became director of the Philharmonic Orchestra and Southern Women's College. Later, he became musical director of Wilson College. Shaw retired as musical director in 1905. He served as organist of the Falling Spring Presbyterian Church from 1895 to 1905. In 1906, Shaw became president of Kee Mar College. By November 1906, he reported issues with nervous prostration. Shaw resigned in April 1907 due to his health issues. Shaw was the head master and teacher of voice and organ in the Paris Texas School of Singing and Organ Instruction. In 1912, Shaw became director of fine arts at Southwestern University. He was also the director of the choir of the First Methodist church in Georgetown, Texas. Shaw was a vocalist specialized in voice culture, conductor, and organist. He was experienced in orchestra and the art of instrumentation. For a short time, Shaw was a baritone of the Boston Ideal Opera Company. He produced an opera that was well received by the press and public. While Shaw has written a number of songs and sacred pieces, he devoted most of his time to composing larger instrumental forms.

In 1935, Shaw received an honorary Ll.D. from Trinity University in recognition of his service to his field.

Personal life 
Shaw's first wife, Mary Augusta Deady, was a noted vocalist. They had two children who survived to adulthood, Mrs. Ralph Mason (Olga) of La Porte, Texas and E. Winfred Shaw of Cleveland Ohio. Shaw died the morning of June 10, 1943, age 79, in Paris, Texas. He is buried at Evergreen Cemetery in Paris, Texas.

References 

1863 births
1943 deaths
Musicians from Baltimore
Musicians from Richmond, Virginia
19th-century American composers
20th-century American composers
American male composers
American music educators
American academic administrators
Heads of universities and colleges in the United States
American organists
American baritones
19th-century American male opera singers
20th-century American male opera singers
Singers from Maryland
Singers from Virginia
Wilson College (Pennsylvania) faculty
Southwestern University faculty
19th-century American educators
20th-century American academics